Notts TV is a British commercial local television channel which broadcasts to the City of Nottingham and the surrounding areas. Notts TV launched on 27 May 2014 on Freeview channel 8 followed by Virgin channel 159. In July 2015, the channel also became available on Sky channel 117. Notts TV also has an extensive video on demand library available on its website with most programming becoming available shortly after broadcast. In April 2016, Notts TV moved to channel 7 on Freeview (the number previously occupied by BBC Three which closed as a linear channel the month before). Notts TV ceased operations on Sky in September 2017.

Notts TV is owned and most of its programming is produced by a consortium of four Nottingham based media-related organisations: Nottingham Post, Nottingham Trent University, Confetti Media Group and Inclusive Digital. Other local independent producers also provide content for the channel.

From opening in 2014, the BBC contributed to the funding of Notts TV for the first three years.

Ofcom has granted the channel a 12-year licence.

Programming

References

External links
 Notts TV - the county’s local television channel

Local television channels in the United Kingdom
Mass media in Nottingham
Nottingham Trent University
Television channels and stations established in 2014
2014 establishments in England